His Best may refer to:
 His Best (Bo Diddley album), 1997
 His Best (Little Walter album), 1997
 His Best (Howlin' Wolf album), 1997
 His Best (Sonny Boy Williamson II album), 1997
 His Best – The Electric B. B. King, 1968

See also
 His Very Best, a 1980 album by Willie Nelson